Pagibaximab is a chimeric monoclonal antibody for the prevention of staphylococcal sepsis in infants with low birth weight. , it is undergoing Phase II/III clinical trials.

References 

Monoclonal antibodies
Experimental drugs